Frederick Howard Brooman CB (3 May 1919 – 8 June 2007) was a British accountant and civil servant.

Careers

World War II
Brooman was called up and served in the Royal West Kent Regiment and, after the Dunkirk Evacuation, in the REME in World War II, working on many artillery weapons, a period when he met his wife.

Civil servant career
Brooman became Accountant and Comptroller General to the Board of the Inland Revenue and, at the time of his retirement was the head of personnel for the Inland Revenue, for which he was awarded a CB on 26 June 1977.

Voluntary sector accountant
After the war, Brooman became involved in the United Reformed Church, and using his knowledge of accounting picked up as working for the Inland Revenue he became the church's accountant. Through hard work, he became the district and then the country Treasurer for the United Reformed Church.

Personal life
In 1950, his first child was born and three years later his second.  Fred Brooman in later life lived in Weybridge, Surrey.  His hobbies included walking, especially scenic mountain hikes, Contract Bridge, jigsaws and anything mechanical.

References

1919 births
2007 deaths
British Army personnel of World War II
English accountants
English civil servants
People from Weybridge
Civil servants in the Board of Inland Revenue
Companions of the Order of the Bath
Members of HM Government Finance Service
Queen's Own Royal West Kent Regiment soldiers
Royal Electrical and Mechanical Engineers soldiers
20th-century English businesspeople